The name Lidia has been used for five tropical cyclones in the Eastern Pacific Ocean.
 Tropical Storm Lidia (1981)
 Hurricane Lidia (1987)
 Hurricane Lidia (1993)
 Tropical Storm Lidia (2005) – No threat to land.
 Tropical Storm Lidia (2017) – Made landfall in Baja California Sur.

Pacific hurricane set index articles